Joe Duckworth is the name of:

 Joe Duckworth (footballer) (1898–?), English professional football goalkeeper
 Joseph Duckworth (1902–1964), USAF pilot, first man to fly into a hurricane
 Joe Duckworth (American football) (1921–2007), American football player